Tetrops bicoloricornis is a species of beetle in the family Cerambycidae. It was described by Nikolay Nikolaevich Plavilstshchikov in 1954. It is known from Kyrgyzstan.

Subspecies
 Tetrops bicoloricornis ferganensis Danilevsky, 2018
 Tetrops bicoloricornis bicoloricornis Kostin, 1973
 Tetrops bicoloricornis oshensis Danilevsky, 2018
 Tetrops bicoloricornis nigricornis Danilevsky, 2018

References

Tetropini
Beetles described in 1954